The following highways are numbered 35:

International
 European route E35

Canada
 Alberta Highway 35
 British Columbia Highway 35
 Ontario Highway 35
 Quebec Autoroute 35
Saskatchewan Highway 35

China 
  G35 Expressway

Costa Rica
 National Route 35

Czech Republic
 part of  D35 Motorway
 part of  I/35 Highway; Czech: Silnice I/35

Iceland
 Route 35 (Iceland)

India

Iran
 Road 35

Israel
 Highway 35 (Israel)

Italy
 Autostrada A35
 State road 35

Japan
 Japan National Route 35
  Nishi-Kyushu Expressway

Jordan

Korea, South
 Expressway 35
 Tongyeong–Daejeon Expressway
 Jungbu Expressway
 National Route 35

Mexico
 Mexican Federal Highway 35

New Zealand
 New Zealand State Highway 35

Thailand 

  Highway 35 (Rama II Road)

United Kingdom
 British A35 (Honiton-Southampton)

United States
 Interstate 35
 Interstate 35E, multiple roads
 Interstate 35W, multiple roads
 U.S. Route 35
 Alabama State Route 35
 Arkansas Highway 35
 California State Route 35
 County Route J35 (California)
 Colorado State Highway 35
 Connecticut Route 35
 Florida State Road 35
 County Road 35B (Hardee County, Florida)
 County Road 35 (Marion County, Florida)
 Georgia State Route 35
Hawaii Route 35 (former)
 Illinois Route 35
 Indiana State Road 35 (former)
 Kentucky Route 35
 Louisiana Highway 35
 Maine State Route 35
 Maryland Route 35
 Massachusetts Route 35
 M-35 (Michigan highway)
 Mississippi Highway 35
 Missouri Route 35 (former)
 Montana Highway 35
 Nebraska Highway 35
 Nebraska Recreation Road 35B
 Nevada State Route 35 (former)
 New Jersey Route 35
 County Route 35 (Bergen County, New Jersey)
 County Route 35 (Ocean County, New Jersey)
 County Route 35 (Monmouth County, New Jersey)
 New Mexico State Road 35
 New York State Route 35
 County Route 35 (Chemung County, New York)
 County Route 35 (Chenango County, New York)
 County Route 35 (Dutchess County, New York)
 County Route 35 (Essex County, New York)
 County Route 35 (Franklin County, New York)
 County Route 35 (Genesee County, New York)
 County Route 35 (Greene County, New York)
 County Route 35 (Livingston County, New York)
 County Route 35 (Montgomery County, New York)
 County Route 35 (Niagara County, New York)
 County Route 35 (Ontario County, New York)
 County Route 35B (Otsego County, New York)
 County Route 35 (Putnam County, New York)
 County Route 35 (Rockland County, New York)
 County Route 35 (Schoharie County, New York)
 County Route 35 (St. Lawrence County, New York)
 County Route 35 (Steuben County, New York)
 County Route 35 (Suffolk County, New York)
 County Route 35B (Suffolk County, New York)
 County Route 35C (Suffolk County, New York)
 County Route 35 (Ulster County, New York)
 County Route 35 (Warren County, New York)
 County Route 35 (Washington County, New York)
 County Route 35 (Wyoming County, New York)
 North Carolina Highway 35
 North Dakota Highway 35
 Ohio State Route 35 (1923) (former)
 Oklahoma State Highway 35
 Oregon Route 35
 Pennsylvania Route 35
 South Carolina Highway 35
 South Dakota Highway 35
 Tennessee State Route 35
 Texas State Highway 35
 Texas State Highway Spur 35
 Farm to Market Road 35
 Texas Park Road 35
 Utah State Route 35
 Vermont Route 35
 Virginia State Route 35
 Washington State Route 35
West Virginia Route 35 (1920s) (former)
 Wisconsin Highway 35
 Wyoming Highway 35

Territories
 Puerto Rico Highway 35
 U.S. Virgin Islands Highway 35

See also
A35 § Roads
List of highways numbered 35A